The Palau de la Metal·lúrgia is a venue located in Barcelona. Constructed for the 1929 International Exposition, it hosted the fencing and the fencing part of the modern pentathlon events for the 1992 Summer Olympics.

References
1992 Summer Olympic official report.  Volume 2. pp. 189–91.

Venues of the 1992 Summer Olympics
Sports venues in Barcelona
Olympic fencing venues
Olympic modern pentathlon venues